Lawyer Vera is a 1937 Czechoslovak comedy film directed by Martin Frič.

Cast
 Truda Grosslichtová as JUDr. Vera Donátová
 Růžena Šlemrová as Ruzena Donátová
 Theodor Pištěk as Jindrich Donát
 Oldřich Nový as Petr 'Tygr' Kucera
 Bedřich Veverka as Eman Pálený
 Ladislav H. Struna as Dlouhý Gusta
 Rudolf Deyl as Consul Raboch
 Stanislav Neumann as Richard Raboch
 Jaroslav Marvan as Grocery Store Proprietor
 Darja Hajská as Marie
 Karel Veverka as JUDr. Basus
 Václav Trégl as The Solicitor [oktabec]
 Čeněk Šlégl as Karel Benda
 Jiří Hron as Jan Vrzal
 Václav Vydra as Emil Cipra (as Václav ml. Vydra)

References

External links
 

1937 films
1937 comedy films
1930s Czech-language films
Czechoslovak black-and-white films
Czechoslovak comedy films
Films directed by Martin Frič
1930s Czech films